City Hall Square is the name of these places:

City Hall Square, Copenhagen, a central square in the capital of Denmark
The City Hall Square, Oslo, a central square in the capital of Norway
City Hall Square, Pamplona-Iruña, a central square in the capital of Navarre

See also
City square (disambiguation)
City Hall (disambiguation)
Town Hall Square (disambiguation)